Balls is the 18th album by the American rock band Sparks, released in 2000.

Balls was a continuation of the techno-pop style that the duo had first explored on 1994's Gratuitous Sax & Senseless Violins, but employed harder, more uptempo beats, as well as a direct, aggressive approach derived from acts such as The Prodigy. The album was packaged in a translucent jewel case that came in a variety of colours (red, yellow, green, blue, orange, black, and turquoise), with a reflective die-cut silver slipcase.

"It's a Knockoff" was recorded for the movie Knock Off, starring Jean-Claude Van Damme, directed by the acclaimed Hong Kong based producer/director Tsui Hark (who had appeared on his own tribute song by the band on Gratuitous Sax & Senseless Violins). It is featured over the closing credits.

Whilst critical reception of Balls was moderately positive, it was not a success in terms of chart performance and failed to match the performance of Gratuitous Sax & Senseless Violins. It did not chart in Germany, UK or US. "More Than A Sex Machine", "The Calm Before The Storm" and "The Angels" were released as singles but did not pick up any significant sales or radio play. The duo had already written a follow-up to Balls in a similar vein. However, the album's poor reception convinced them to abandon it and pursue a new direction entirely on 2002's Lil' Beethoven.

Critical reception 

Critical reception to Balls was mixed. Mojo offered a positive summary describing the album as "highly listenable and equally danceable, a kind of Pet Shop Boys meet Gary Numan at the gates of Georgio (sic) Moroder." Allmusic rated the album three stars out of five noting that: "This being Sparks' 18th album, the Mael brothers clearly know what they're doing. Though both the lyrics and the production are quirky, there is nothing dumb about them", and highlighting "the melodies [which] have brilliant pop hooks and Russell's [soaring] voice."

Q panned the album describing it as: "a profound disappointment... few songs lift themselves above pedestrian tedium." NME also reviewed the album unfavourably remarking: "age has inexplicably withered Sparks' bow-legged muse; where once was genre-bending acid eclecticism and inspired wit, Sparks now seem content to dole out tired, tinny electro-pop and unfunny puns."

Re-issues 
In 2008, Sparks' own record label Lil' Beethoven Records reissued the album in a digipak sleeve, featuring different sleeve-art and with two bonus tracks; "The Calm Before the Opera" and "The Calm Before the Storm (Full Length Instrumental)".

In 2022 the album was remastered and released on vinyl for the first time, as part of the "21st Century Sparks" remaster series. CD and digital issues again contain "The Calm Before The Opera" as well as seven new bonus tracks including the concert opener "It's A Sparks Show", music from the Kuntzel+Deygas short film A Cute Candidate, and an unused theme song for animated series The Oblongs.

This reissue entered the UK independent chart at #16.

Track listing

Personnel 
 Russell Mael – vocals, production
 Ron Mael – keyboards, programming, production
 Tammy Glover – drums
 Aksinja Berger – speech on "Aeroflot"
 Amelia Cone – narration on "Scheherazade"
 John Thomas – mixing, engineering

Charts

References 

Sparks (band) albums
2000 albums
Oglio Records albums
Albums recorded in a home studio